Yahor Maistrov (also: Egor Maistrov, born 14 February 1988) is a Belarusian former competitive ice dancer. He married Ksenia Shmirina in 2007 and began skating with her that year. He previously competed with Alexandra Maksimova, with whom he teamed up in 2005 and was the 2006 Belarusian national silver medalists.

Competitive highlights
(with Shmirina)

(with Maksimova)

External links
 
 

Living people
Belarusian male ice dancers
Figure skaters from Minsk
1988 births